Jérôme René Marcel Rothen (born 31 March 1978) is a French former professional footballer who played as a winger.

Rothen won 13 caps for the France national football team.  He represented his country at the 2004 European Football Championship and won the FIFA Confederations Cup with France in 2003. At club level, Rothen won the Coupe de France once and the Coupe de la Ligue twice with Paris Saint-Germain. He also won the Coupe de la Ligue with Monaco. Rothen was a skilled winger who specialised in free kicks, crossing and passing.

Club career

Early career
Rothen underwent training at the famous Clairefontaine National Football Academy in France.

He started his career with Caen. He then moved to Troyes AC where he played under manager Alain Perrin.

AS Monaco
He was bought by AS Monaco on 1 January 2002 for €5 million. With Monaco, Rothen won the Coupe de la Ligue in 2003. He also helped the club reach the final of the Champions League in May 2004, where they lost to FC Porto 3–0.

Paris Saint-Germain

A native of the Paris metropolitan area, he fulfilled a childhood dream when he signed for the capital side Paris Saint-Germain in 2004 for €11 million. He rejected lucrative offers from more powerful European clubs such as Manchester United, Chelsea and Valencia in order to join PSG, the club he supported during his youth.

In the French capital, his dream soon turned sour. Often injured, Rothen appeared in only 18 league games and 2 Champions League fixtures in his debut season. 2005-06 was equally disappointing. Under the orders of Laurent Fournier and then Guy Lacombe, the left winger struggled to reproduce the kind of displays that had made him famous at Monaco. Often injured, he nonetheless took part in a Coupe de France win over fierce rivals Olympique de Marseille.

In the second half of 2006, returning from injury, Rothen found himself cast aside by Guy Lacombe. In December 2006, he faked an injury in order to organize a transfer deal that would materialize during the January transfer window. He was then tipped to join Lille OSC, but then learned about Lacombe's imminent sacking from Paris Saint-Germain. The arrival of new coach Paul Le Guen in January 2007 convinced him to stay put. Gradually, he began to recover his best form. With the club battling against relegation, Rothen's revival was one of the factors that enabled PSG to save their spot in the top flight.

In the summer of 2007, several clubs expressed interest for the midfielder, including champions Olympique Lyonnais, who were looking for a replacement for the outgoing Florent Malouda. Rothen stayed in Paris, and following a great start to the 2007–08 season, was voted as the league's player of the month in September. He regained a spot in the France national football team and even netted a free-kick on 13 October 2007 against the Faroe Islands.

In 2007-08, Paris Saint-Germain struggled even more than the previous season. In such a context, Rothen became an increasingly important player due to his creativity and crossing ability. Such was his importance to the club that French media would describe PSG as "dependent upon Rothen" and "playing a game that is excessively left-sided", the flank which the player occupied. During those years, several signings like Sergey Semak, Bonaventure Kalou and Williamis Souza were made with the aim of reducing the side's dependence on Rothen and introduce some kind of creative threat on the right flank too. None of these solutions worked, and PSG continued to rely upon Rothen to pull them out of the relegation trap in May 2008.

2008-09 was his last season in Paris. He managed to make 34 league appearances, his best tally in a single season since 2003-04 in Monaco at AS Monaco. However, he had lost much of his importance to the club, with the arrival of other creative players such as Stéphane Sessègnon and former Monaco team mate Ludovic Giuly. In the summer of 2009, Paul Le Guen left the club to be replaced by Antoine Kombouaré, who deemed Rothen surplus to requirements and banished him to the reserves squad.

Rangers
On 1 September 2009 Rothen agreed to join Scottish Premier League club Rangers on a one-year loan deal from PSG. He made his debut for the club on 12 September 2009 against Motherwell. He made his first appearance in the Champions league for Rangers in their 1–1 draw away to Stuttgart.

Ankaragücü
After going back to France Rothen's relationship with Rangers soured and the club were looking to move Rothen on, as he was deemed surplus to requirements, rather than pay his salary for the remainder of the season when it looked like he would not figure in the squad.

Rothen flew to Turkey on 22 January 2010 to sign a six-month loan deal with Ankaragücü after rejecting advances from Greek sides Larissa, Kavala and Iraklis. On 29 January 2010, he signed a six-month contract with Ankaragücü.

Bastia
Almost a year after Paris resigned his contract, Rothen signed in May 2011 a two-year contract with the Corsican club of SC Bastia, newly promoted to the French Ligue 2. Rothen made his team debut on 29 July 2011 against Istres, and Bastia won the match 3–1. He won the Ligue 2 title with the team in the 2011-12 season and was selected as the Ligue 2 Player of the Year.

Return to Caen
In July 2013, Rothen rejoined his first senior club, Caen. On 1 January 2014, he announced his retirement from football.

International career
Rothen made his debut on 29 March 2003 against Malta.

He was a member of the France national football team at Euro 2004, where he made a brief substitute appearance in their defeat by Greece in the quarter-finals. Rothen was not selected in the 2006 FIFA World Cup squad for France. He was recalled to the squad for Euro 2008 qualifying and, on 10 October 2007, marked his comeback with a superbly taken free-kick against the Faroe Islands, the last scored free-kick for France as of 13 June 2015.

Autobiography
On 8 October 2008, Rothen published his autobiography You're Not Going To Believe Me.  The book has generated significant attention in the media, notably for its description of an incident concerning Zinedine Zidane, his former teammate in the France national team.

According to Rothen, the incident occurred during the second leg of Monaco's 2004 Champions League quarter-final win over Real Madrid. Monaco had overturned a 4–2 first leg deficit, and were 3–1 up with seconds left to play when Zidane tackled Rothen from behind. "It was a foul and I went down, admittedly I made a bit more of it, but anyone would have done the same, as we were trying to buy some seconds," Rothen wrote. "Zidane leant over me and said: 'Get up, you son of a bitch.'"

The expression Rothen claims Zidane used, 'fils de pute', is a variation on what Marco Materazzi is alleged to have said to Zidane before the head-butt that proved the iconic moment of the 2006 World Cup final. "I was surprised but put it down to his frustration, and I expected him to apologise at the end of the game, but he said nothing," Rothen continued. "I thought the next time we saw each other with the France team he would say sorry, and then it would be forgotten, but he didn't and that disappointed me."

In a subsequent interview with the French newspaper L'Équipe, Rothen stated he did not intend to smear Zidane's image by publicizing the incident.  He also denies having received pressure from the latter's camp to remove the offending passage, as had been reported in the press.

Career statistics

Club
Source:

International
Source:

Honours
Troyes
UEFA Intertoto Cup: 2001

Monaco
Coupe de la Ligue: 2002–03
UEFA Champions League runner-up: 2003–04

Paris Saint-Germain
Coupe de France: 2005–06; runner-up: 2007–08
Coupe de la Ligue: 2007–08
Trophée des Champions runner-up: 2004, 2006

Bastia
Ligue 2: 2011–12

France
FIFA Confederations Cup: 2003

Individual
Ligue 2 Team of the Year: 1999–2000, 2011–12
Ligue 1 Team of the Year: 2002–03
LFP Player of the Month: February 2003
UNFP Player of the Month: September 2007 (Ligue 1), February 2012 (Ligue 2)
Ligue 2 Player of the Year: 2011–12

References

External links

FFF profile 

1978 births
Living people
People from Châtenay-Malabry
Footballers from Hauts-de-Seine
Association football midfielders
French footballers
France international footballers
French expatriate footballers
Stade Malherbe Caen players
ES Troyes AC players
AS Monaco FC players
Paris Saint-Germain F.C. players
Rangers F.C. players
MKE Ankaragücü footballers
SC Bastia players
Ligue 1 players
Scottish Premier League players
Expatriate footballers in Scotland
Expatriate footballers in Turkey
French expatriate sportspeople in Turkey
2003 FIFA Confederations Cup players
UEFA Euro 2004 players
FIFA Confederations Cup-winning players
INF Clairefontaine players
FC Versailles 78 players
Süper Lig players
Ligue 2 players
Expatriate footballers in Monaco
French expatriate sportspeople in Monaco